Neena may refer to:

People
 Neena (Tamil actress)
 Neena Beber, American television producer
 Neena Cheema, Indian TV and film actress
 Neena Gill, Member of the European Parliament for the West Midlands
 Neena Gupta, Indian film and television actress and director-producer
 Neena Haridas, Indian journalist
 Neena Kulkarni, Indian film actress and producer
 Neena Kurup, Indian film and TV actress who works in Malayalam Cinema
 Neena Verma, Indian politician from Madhya Pradesh

Others
 Neena (film), a 2015 Malayalam film by Lal Jose
 Neena Thurman aka Domino, a Marvel Comics character